Centro Neuro Psychiatrique de Nouakchott (English: Neuropsychiatry Center Nouakchott) is a psychiatric hospital in Nouakchott, Mauritania. It is located on the Avenue Gamal Abdel Nasser, west of the Ministry of Energy headquarters and the Grand National Hospital of Mauritania and opposite the Reserve Naturel de Sel Iode.

References

Hospitals in Mauritania
Nouakchott